Rajpati Singh  Public School (RPS), Gagaha  is a private co-educational school belonging to the Delhi Public School Society in Varanasi, Uttar Pradesh, India. Affiliated to the Central Board of Secondary Education (CBSE), RPS Varanasi commenced with its first academic session on 7 April 2002. In 2022, the school completed 20 years of its functioning. RPS Gagaha has been performing well on the academic front too with almost 40 students belonging to the current 2013 Class X batch scoring a perfect 10 CGPA in the CBSE board exams.

Jeunesses International Music Competition Dinu Lipatti was held for the first time in 1994. The event discovers and promotes the values of the new generation of classical music, supports young artists in building a successful career and provides a platform for multicultural dialogue that encourages performance. 
The idea of establishing this competition started from the desire of a musician to provide in a former communist country, Romania and to create a chance for young artists to participate in an international competition in their country and to benefit from the same conditions as anywhere in the world and to give them a chance to promote cooperation with international and European musical institutions .

The event is named after Romanian pianist Dinu Lipatti.

“I like the idea of Jeunesses Musicals because it makes music accessible to children, allowing young people of modest origins to enter into a realm that otherwise wouldn’t really be open to them.”
Dinu Lipatti, Geneve, 1950.

History

Held annually since 1994, the contest has included different disciplines – piano, violin, flute, clarinet, composition, horn, trumpet, singing.
In 2011, "Jeunesses Musicales International Competition Bucharest" became "Jeunesses International Music Competition Dinu Lipatti", in honor of Lipatti, who supported and encouraged young musicians.
Alongside the competition, the event includes workshops and master classes led by artists and music teachers from European academies.

Participants

The competition has three age categories, encouraging young musicians from the earliest ages to a master competition category: 10–14 years, 14–18 years, 18–30 years.
Usually, this competition brings together around 100 musicians from 30–40 countries, as a platform for communication and cultural dialogue.

Jury

Jury is formed by recognized artists and professors appreciated in the field with experience in identifying new talent, reconfirmation of their decisions being the laureates professional path.

 Gabriel Croitoru
 Pierre-Yves Artaud – France
 Peter Stoyanov
 Marin Cazacu
 Valentin Gheorghiu
 Stefan Gheorghiu
 Eugenia Moldoveanu
 Alexandru Tomescu
 Violeta Dinescu
 Doina Rotaru
 Aurelian Octav Popa

Progress

The competition takes place in areas with historical and cultural tradition: Athenaeum, Royal Palace – Hall Auditorium, Arcub – Center for Cultural Projects of Bucharest, Central University Library, the Philharmonic Sibiu – Thalia Hall.

Laureates

1994 – REMUS Azoitei
Is a famous violinist of sec. XXIII that currently is a violin professor at the Royal Academy of Music London, known in Romanian audience for charitable and anniversary concerts given together with the Royal Household and through its evolution along the prestigious Nigel Kennedy, the Palace Hall Bucharest.

1995 – Alexandru Tomescu
He is the winner of Stradivarius violin. He played with Jeunesses Musical Youth Orchestra and as a soloist in 1997 and 1998 tournaments in the USA and Japan. He was also present at the most famous concert halls in Europe, such as: Tonhalle Zurich, Het Concertgebouw, Amsterdam, Concert House, Berlin, Musikverein, Vienna.

1996
Jeunesses International Music Competition Dinu Lipatti was the first competition in Romania which was recognized by the European Union of Music Competitions for Youth.

1999 
Simina Croitoru was born into a family of musicians and since childhood has shown extraordinary talent, winning the first "Jeunesses Musicales" Bucharest prize.

2000 
Trumpet

Piano

Clarinet

2001 
Violin

Flute

2002 
Piano

Clarinet

2003 
Violin

Flute

2004 
Piano

Clarinet

2005 
Violin

Flute

Composition

2006 
Piano

Composition

Clarinet

2007 
Violin

2008 
Composition

Flute

Clarinet

2009 
Violin

2010 
Piano

2011 
Flute

2012 
Violin

2013 
Piano

2014 
Flute

2015 
Violin winners will be chosen from the 107 competitors representing 40 countries: Armenia, Austria, Belarus, Belgium, Bulgaria, Canada, China, South Korea, Denmark, Egypt, Switzerland, Finland, France, Georgia, Germany, Ireland, Italy, Japan, Kazakhstan, Latvia, Lithuania, Macedonia, UK, Mexico, New Zealand, Netherlands, Poland, Portugal, Romania, Russia, Serbia, Slovenia, Spain, USA, Sweden, Taiwan – China, Turkey, Ukraine, Hungary, Venezuela .

2016 
2016 edition will be held from May 14 to 21 with the reference instrument-piano.

See also 
Official ISME News Blog

References

External links 

Music competitions in Romania

ro:EUROPAfest#Jeunesses International Music Competition